Charles Digby Harrod (25 January 1841 – 15 August 1905) was an English businessman who expanded Harrods in London into a department store after his father, Charles Henry Harrod had retired.

References

1841 births
1905 deaths
People from Chelsea, London
English merchants
People from Whitechapel
English Anglicans
19th-century English businesspeople